The 2016 NCAA Division I softball season, play of college softball in the United States organized by the National Collegiate Athletic Association (NCAA) at the Division I level, began in February 2016.  The season progressed through the regular season, many conference tournaments and championship series, and concluded with the 2016 NCAA Division I softball tournament and 2016 Women's College World Series.  The Women's College World Series, consisting of the eight remaining teams in the NCAA Tournament and held annually in Oklahoma City at ASA Hall of Fame Stadium, ended in June 2016.

Conference standings

Women's College World Series
The 2016 Women's College World Series began on June 2–8 in Oklahoma City.

Season leaders
Batting
Batting average: .504 – Danielle Smith, Coppin State Eagles
RBIs: 87 – Tina Iosefa, Georgia Bulldogs
Home runs: 23 – Tina Iosefa, Georgia Bulldogs & Morgan Noad, Coastal Carolina Chanticleers

Pitching
Wins: 38-3 – Paige Parker, Oklahoma Sooners
ERA: 0.76 (24 ER/221.0 IP) – Kylee Hanson, Florida Atlantic Owls
Strikeouts: 336 – Savannah Jo Dorsey, Ohio Bobcats & Sara Groenewegen, Minnesota Golden Gophers

Records
NCAA Division I single game intentional walks:
5 – Darian Tautalafua, Long Beach State 49ers; May 8, 2016

NCAA Division I single game total bases:
17 – Carli Kayler, Troy Trojans; March 19, 2016

Freshman class hits:
104 – Tatyana Forbes, Coastal Carolina Chanticleers

Awards
USA Softball Collegiate Player of the Year:
Sierra Romero, Michigan Wolverines

NFCA National Player of the Year:
Sierra Romero, Michigan Wolverines

Honda Sports Award Softball:
Sierra Romero, Michigan Wolverines

espnW National Player of the Year:
Kasey Cooper, Auburn Tigers

NFCA National Freshman of the Year:
Amanda Lorenz, Florida Gators

NFCA Catcher of the Year: 
Lexie Elkins, Louisiana

NFCA Golden Shoe Award: 
Katie Lacour, Southeastern Louisiana

All America Teams
The following players were members of the All-American Teams.

First Team

Second Team

Third Team

References